The 2001 FIVB Women's World Grand Champions Cup was held in Saitama and Fukuoka, Japan from November 13 to November 18, 2001.

Teams

Squads

Competition formula
The competition formula of the 2001 Women's World Grand Champions Cup is the single Round-Robin system. Each team plays once against each of the 5 remaining teams. Points are accumulated during the whole tournament, and the final standing is determined by the total points gained.

Venues
Saitama Super Arena (Saitama)
Marine Messe (Fukuoka)

Results

|}

Saitama round

|}

Fukuoka round

|}

Final standing

Awards
MVP:  Yang Hao
Best Scorer:  Yekaterina Gamova
Best Spiker:  Elizaveta Tishchenko
Best Blocker:  Yekaterina Gamova
Best Server:  Miyuki Takahashi
Best Setter:  Tatyana Gracheva
Best Digger:  Stacy Sykora
Best Receiver:  Virna Dias

External links
Official Page of the 2001 World Grand Champions Cup

FIVB Volleyball Women's World Grand Champions Cup
World Grand Champions Cup
2001 in women's volleyball
FIVB Men's World Grand Champions cup
V